Daniel Charles Smith Jr. (born September 15, 1975) is a former American professional right-handed baseball pitcher who played Major League Baseball from – for the Texas Rangers, Montreal Expos and Boston Red Sox. In his major league debut, Smith struck out nine batters, retiring 20 in a row at one point, in a win over the Boston Red Sox. Tony Gwynn recorded his 3,000th career hit off Smith on August 6, 1999. In July 2003, he was placed on the disabled list with inflammation in his rotator cuff which required surgery and would not pitch in the majors again. 

In July 2018, Smith was named the CEO of Watco, a transportation company based in Pittsburg, Kansas.

References

External links

1975 births
Living people
American expatriate baseball players in Canada
Baseball players from New Jersey
Boston Red Sox players
Brevard County Manatees players
Buffalo Bisons (minor league) players
Charlotte Rangers players
Charleston RiverDogs players
Gulf Coast Rangers players
Major League Baseball pitchers
Montreal Expos players
New Orleans Zephyrs players
Oklahoma RedHawks players
Ottawa Lynx players
Pawtucket Red Sox players
People from Flemington, New Jersey
Sportspeople from Hunterdon County, New Jersey
Tulsa Drillers players
21st-century American railroad executives
Baseball players from Kansas